Yuxarı Ələz (also, Yuxarı-ələz, Yuxarı Alayaz, Yukharu-Alyaz, Yukhary Alayaz, and Yukhary Alyaz) is a village and the least populous municipality in the Siazan Rayon of Azerbaijan.  It has a population of 350.  The municipality consists of the villages of Yuxarı Ələz, Yanıq Ələz, Ərziküş, Qaragöz, Köhnə Quşçu, Günəvşa, and Hacışəkər.

References 

Populated places in Siyazan District